Oola (  or  ) is a village in County Limerick in Ireland. It is near the border with County Tipperary in the midwest of the country. The village is home to a church (Church of The Sacred Heart), a petrol station, a convenience store, two public houses, a GAA pitch, a post office, a takeaway, a betting shop, a credit union, a hall, and a chemist. As of the 2016 census, Oola had a population of 324 inhabitants.

History
The ruins of Oola Castle stand close to the village and in 1825, some large and perfect antlers of the Irish elk were discovered; and, in 1828, a brazen trumpet, and spear and arrowheads of bronze were found, which were placed in the museum of Trinity College, Dublin.

Transport
The main N24 road from Limerick to Waterford passes through the town, with the town of Tipperary lying 12 kilometres south-east of Oola. 

Though the town is no longer connected to the rail network, the important station at Limerick Junction is nearby. Oola railway station opened on 9 May 1848 and finally closed on 9 September 1963.

See also
 List of towns and villages in Ireland

References

External links
 oolacc.com — Oola Community Council
 Oola Village Graveyard
 St Anthony's Cemetery

Towns and villages in County Limerick